Municipal budgetary institution of culture Museum of Local History of Volgodonsk District (Russian: Музей краеведения Волгодонского района ) is a museum of local history in the village Romanovskaya, Rostov region. The director is Dzyuba Irina Anatolyevna. The museum was opened in 1998. It is located in the building built in 1908 with a total area of 516 m². Visiting of the museum is included in tourist routes of regional travel companies.

Activity 
The main directions of the museum's work are the storage and exhibition of antiquities, everyday life of peoples inhabiting the region; the revival and preservation of folk traditions, customs, rituals, crafts and crafts inherent in the population of the Rostov region in Volgodonsk district.

The museum is engaged in studying the epic poetry, ethnography and folklore of the local population, and collects and spreads historical material about formation of villages, farms, settlements, and about the origin of their names.

Special attention is paid to patriotic education of youth and younger generation. Meetings, evenings, lecture, excursions are for this purpose held, thematic exhibitions expositions and exhibitions are arranged. The museum is engaged in scientific and educational, research activity.

The museum developed and operates a patriotic section "Soldier's medallion", which allowed to find the nameless graves and military burial places of the Great Patriotic War on the territory of the district, to restore the names of the dead soldiers.

Exposition 
Permanent exhibitions are organized in the museum: "Romanov underground", "Winners", "Objects of everyday life of Don Cossacks", "Gornitsa".

The attention of museum visitors is provided with rare documents, correspondence, photographs of Romanov underground workers, historical material of their activity and death.

In the museum there are guided tours not only through the halls of the museum, but also along the streets of Romanovskaya village, memorable places of the district, monuments.

The main fund of the museum - 1097 units of storage, scientific and auxiliary - 608 units of storage.

Also, the museum developed a layout of the village, in a scale of 1:5.

References 

Tourist attractions in Rostov Oblast 
Museums in Rostov Oblast